The 73rd Engineer Regiment was a Territorial regiment of the Royal Engineers, part of the British Army active from 1969 to 2014.

History 
The 73rd Engineer Regiment was formed when the Territorial Army was drastically reduced in the late 1960s.  The regiment was created as a reinforcement combat engineer unit to support the I (BR) Corps in Germany.  From 1969 - 1991 the regiment was assigned to the 29th Engineer Brigade.  In 1991 the regiment was re-organized to become the 73rd Air Support Engineer Regiment.  In 1997 the regiment was assigned to 12 (Air Support) Engineer Brigade.  Parts of the regiment served in Operation Telic I and Operation Telic III.  In 2006 the regiment was re-organized to become the 73rd Engineer Regiment.  In 2014 the regiment was disbanded and only 1 squadron remained and moved to the 33rd Explosive Ordnance Disposal Engineer Regiment.

Structure 
The regiment's structure changed a bit through its history, the structure just before disbandment:

 Headquarters Troop
575 (Sherwood Foresters) Field Squadron
 129 (East Riding) Field Squadron
 350 (Nottinghamshire) Field Squadron

A number of former squadrons served with the regiment including:

 129 Headquarters and Support Squadron
217 (London) Field Squadron
 272 (West Riding Artillery) Field Squadron
 873 Movement Light Squadron
 106 (West Riding) Field Squadron
 The Jersey Field Squadron, Royal Engineers

References 

Regiments of the Royal Engineers